Gary Briggs may refer to:

 Gary Briggs (footballer) (born 1959), retired English footballer
 Gary Briggs (musician), lead singer and guitarist of Haven (band) and The Strays
 Gary Briggs, founder of Dingo Australia, compact hydraulic equipment manufacturer